In mathematics, particularly in set theory, if  is a regular uncountable cardinal then  the filter of all sets containing a club subset of  is a -complete filter closed under diagonal intersection called the club filter.

To see that this is a filter, note that  since it is thus both closed and unbounded (see club set). If  then any subset of  containing  is also in  since  and therefore anything containing it, contains a club set.

It is a -complete filter because the intersection of fewer than  club sets is a club set. We can repeat this process, getting a sequence of sequences  where each element of a sequence is greater than every member of the previous sequences. This limit is then contained in every  and therefore  and is greater than 

Then  and  since it is in each  with

See also

References

 Jech, Thomas, 2003. Set Theory: The Third Millennium Edition, Revised and Expanded.  Springer.  .

Set theory